is a Japanese footballer who plays for Avispa Fukuoka.

Club statistics
Updated to 21 July 2022.

References

External links
 Profile at Renofa Yamaguchi
 

1992 births
Living people
Osaka University of Health and Sport Sciences alumni
Association football people from Shiga Prefecture
Japanese footballers
J2 League players
J3 League players
Renofa Yamaguchi FC players
Mito HollyHock players
Avispa Fukuoka players
Association football goalkeepers